Kannamoochi (transl. "Hide and Seek") is a 2020 Indian Indian-Tamil-language horror web series an Original for ZEE5 and directed by Avinaash Hariharan and produced by Happy Unicorn and TrendLoud Production House. The series stars Shamna Kasim, Amzath, Baby Aaradhya Shri, Shwethaa Shri and Smarabh. The series comprised five episodes and was released on ZEE5 on 13 March 2020.

Plot
Priya with her deaf and dumb daughter Aishu, relocate to Chennai from Bangalore for a new life in a dilapidated apartment. Twenty years before in the same apartment complex, a family of four, face a tragic incident. Except for a mentally challenged boy, the rest of the family was brutally murdered. Inspector Louthersamy who was investigating the case dies a mysterious death when he almost cracked the case. Priya's daughter Aishu disappears in a procession. Priya desperately searches for her and in the process realises that Manju is a part of the deceased family which was murdered twenty years back. Priya needs to resolve the mystery behind the brutal murder which happened twenty years ago to get her daughter back.

Cast 
 Shamna Kasim as Priya
 Amzath as Santosh
 Baby Aaradhya Shri as Aishu
 Shwethaa Shri as Manju
 Smarabh as Balu
 Bhargav as Young Balu 
 Vivek Prasanna as Devaraj
 Gayathri as Devaraj's wife
 Bose Venkat as Loudersamy
 Subhashini as Loudersamy's wife
 Sri Charan as Inspector
 Saranya as Poongavanam
 Radhakrishnan as Doctor
 Rukmani as Doctor's wife

Episodes

References

External links 
 

ZEE5 original programming
Tamil-language web series
2020 Tamil-language television series debuts
Amazon Prime Video original programming
Tamil-language thriller television series
Tamil-language horror fiction television series
2020 Tamil-language television series endings